Mademoiselle Béatrice is a 1943 French comedy film directed by Max de Vaucorbeil and starring Gaby Morlay, André Luguet and Louise Carletti. The film's sets were designed by the art director Raymond Druart.

Synopsis 
A student in Paris is in love with Jeanette, but her family seem to present an obstacle to marriage. Fortunately Aunt Béatrice steps in to assist and all eventually turns out happily.

Cast
 Gaby Morlay as 	Béatrice
 André Luguet as Hubert de Sainte-Croix
 Louise Carletti as 	Jeanette
 Jacques Baumer as Maître Bergas
 Germaine Charley as 	Madame de Malempré
 Marguerite Deval as 	La vieille dame du banc
 Louis Salou as Maurin-Gautier
 Jean Périer as 	Le vieux monsieur du banc 
 Sinoël as 	Dagobert
 Gabrielle Fontan as 	Angèle
 Noëlle Norman as 	Virginie de Malempré
 Génia Vaury as Madame Philippon
 Jimmy Gaillard as Christian Bergas
 Pierre Bertin as 	Archange

References

Bibliography
 Bertin-Maghit, Jean Pierre. Le cinéma français sous Vichy: les films français de 1940 à 1944. Revue du Cinéma Albatros, 1980.
 Rège, Philippe. Encyclopedia of French Film Directors, Volume 1. Scarecrow Press, 2009.

External links 
 

1943 films
1940s French-language films
1943 comedy films
French comedy films
Films directed by Max de Vaucorbeil
Gaumont Film Company films
Films set in Paris
1940s French films